Thomas Robert Brice (born 24 August 1981) in Woodville, South Australia is an Australian baseballer.

Career
A left-handed power hitter, he was drafted to the Chicago White Sox in the 2002 Major League Baseball Draft in the 24th round after being named as the 2002 Alabama Junior College Player of the Year.

In 2004, he was part of the Australian Olympic baseball team, who achieved a silver medal in the baseball tournament at the Athens Olympics. In the Gold Medal Game, down 2–0 in the 4th with two on and two out, Brice hit a long fly to center against Norge Vera that was caught by CF Carlos Tabares at the wall in a controversial play that got Jon Deeble ejected for arguing the call. He finished 0 for 3 with a walk in the 6–2 defeat as Australia won Silver.

He played right field for the Australian national team during the 2006 and 2009 World Baseball Classic.  He has also played for South Australia in the Claxton Shield. and has played in Japan, Taiwan and Sweden.

References

External links

CPBL

1981 births
Living people
Adelaide Bite players
Australian expatriate baseball players in Japan
Australian expatriate baseball players in Taiwan
Australian expatriate baseball players in the Czech Republic
Australian expatriate baseball players in the Netherlands
Australian expatriate baseball players in the United States
Australian expatriate sportspeople in Sweden
Baseball first basemen
Baseball outfielders
Baseball players at the 2004 Summer Olympics
Bristol White Sox players
DOOR Neptunus players
Kannapolis Intimidators players
Macoto Cobras players
Medalists at the 2004 Summer Olympics
Olympic baseball players of Australia
Olympic silver medalists for Australia
Olympic medalists in baseball
Sportsmen from South Australia
St. Paul Saints players
Winston-Salem Warthogs players
2006 World Baseball Classic players